Belogorsky is a rural locality (a village) in Bishkainsky Selsoviet, Aurgazinsky District, Bashkortostan, Russia. The population was 15 as of 2010. There is 1 street.

Geography 
Belogorsky is located 23 km east of Tolbazy (the district's administrative centre) by road. Bishkain is the nearest rural locality.

References 

Rural localities in Aurgazinsky District